The Iranian Volleyball Super League 2022-23 was the 36th season of the Iranian Volleyball Super League, the highest professional volleyball league in Iran. The season started on 28 September 2022 and ended on 7 March 2023.

Regular season

Standings

Playoffs
All times are Iran Standard Time (UTC+03:30).
All series were the best-of-three format, except for the single-match 3rd place playoff and final.

Quarterfinals
Shahdab Yazd vs. Ifa Ceram

Hoorsun Ramsar vs. PAS Gorgan

Labanyat Haraz Amol vs. Foolad Sirjan

Paykan Yazd vs. Nian Electronic

Semifinals
Shahdab Yazd vs. PAS Gorgan

Labanyat Haraz Amol Yazd vs. Paykan

3rd place
PAS Gorgan vs. Paykan

The 3rd place playoffs between PAS Gorgan and Paykan Tehran were canceled. The two teams shared the 3rd place.

Final
Shahdab Yazd vs. Labanyat Haraz Amol

Playouts
All times are Iran Standard Time (UTC+03:30).
All series were the best-of-three format.

Final standings

References

External links
Iran Volleyball Federation

League 2022-23
Iran Super League, 2022-23
Iran Super League, 2022-23
Volleyball League, 2022-23
Volleyball League, 2022-23